Slant was a Catholic magazine associated with the University of Cambridge and the Dominican Order during the 1960s, and of the group associated with this magazine. It sought to combine Catholic belief with left-wing politics and was influenced by the thinking of Ludwig Wittgenstein and Karl Marx. Influential members included Terry Eagleton and Herbert McCabe. Denys Turner is a significant theologian influenced by Slant.

Description
The context of Slant has been explained by James Smith in his critical introduction to Terry Eagleton. Slant came into being in the mid-1960s in Cambridge, as a journal "devoted to a Catholic exploration of .. radical politics". The first issue was published in spring 1964. This issue began with an introduction by Raymond Williams and for the first six issues Slant was a quarterly journal. From volume 2 (February/March 1966), it evolved to a bimonthly publication, which was eventually published by Sheed and Ward, a Catholic publishing house. Slant ceased publication in 1970 after 30 issues.

The editorial board of Slant included a number of individuals who were at that time students at Cambridge, or who had recently been students in Cambridge, and who subsequently went on to academic careers: Adrian Cunningham (who went on to be Professor of Religious Studies at the University of Lancaster), Terry Eagleton, and Leo Pyle (later, Professor of Biotechnology, University of Reading). Martin Shaw (later professor of sociology and international relations at the Universities of Hull and Sussex) was its student organiser.

See also
 Christian socialism

References

Catholic magazines
Christian socialist publications
Defunct magazines published in the United Kingdom
Magazines disestablished in 1970
Magazines established in 1964
Religious magazines published in the United Kingdom